David B. Rowe, is a folk singer from Maine.

Rowe was born in Lewiston, Maine on April 10, 1973, the only son, one of two children of Tom Rowe and his wife Joanne Demers.  He also has three half sisters from his father's second marriage.  He is a third generation musician following his father Tom and mother Joanne, an uncle and both grandfathers. Rowe was the first bass player for the Makem Brothers, the sons of famous Irish musician Tommy Makem. Rowe studied musical composition at the Hartt School of Music at the University of Hartford.  While performing as a guitarist and vocalist with his father Tom Rowe as Rowe by Rowe, they added Denny Breau, brother of Lenny Breau and became Turkey Hollow.  Rowe is also Choir Director of the First Universalist Church, Auburn, Maine.

Discography
Rowe by Rowe (1996) – Tom and Dave Rowe – Outer Green OGR8933
Turkey Hollow Consort (1999) - Turkey Hollow - Outer Green OGR8944
Live Turkey! (2001) - Turkey Hollow - Outer Green OGR8948
By the Way (2002) – Dave Rowe - Outer Green OGR8949
Big Shoes (2004) – Dave Rowe – Outer Green OGR8956
Rolling Home (2005) – Dave Rowe (Trio) – Outer Green OGR8959
The Good Life (2006) – Dave Rowe (Trio) – Outer Green OGR8962
A Holiday Concert (2007) – Dave Rowe Trio with Denny Breau and Phil House - Outer Green OGR8964 
Three's a Charm (2007)- Dave Rowe (Trio) - Outer Green OGR 8965
The Music Never Dies (2009) - Dave Rowe – Outer Green OGR8969
Greatest Hits (2010) – Squid Jiggers - Dave Rowe label VLM0001
33 1/3 (2011) Squid Jiggers – CD Baby / Dave Rowe label VLM0002
All of the Dreams (2014) - Dave Rowe – Dave Rowe label VLM0013
In Retrospect (2015) - Dave Rowe - Dave Rowe label
''Live at Baldwin's Station (2016) - Dave Rowe - Dave Rowe label

References

External links
 The Dave Rowe Trio in Boston Globe accessed October 18, 2014.
 Dave Rowe Trio review Maine Sun Journal accessed October 18, 2014.
 The Good Life - Dave Rowe Trio - FAME (Folk and Acoustic Music Exchange) accessed October 18, 2014.
 Dave Rowe on AllMusic accessed October 18, 2014.
 Dave Rowe Trio on AllMusic accessed October 18, 2014.
 The Squid Jiggers on AllMusic accessed October 18, 2014.
 Turkey Hollow Turkey Hollow on AllMusic accessed October 19, 2014.
 Tom Rowe biography accessed October 18, 2014.
 Tom Rowe accessed October 18, 2014.
 The Squid Jiggers accessed October 18, 2014.
 Dave Rowe Trio accessed October 18, 2014. 
 Dave Rowe and the Dave Rowe Trio accessed October 18, 2014.
 Dave Rowe accessed October 18, 2014.

1973 births
Singers from Maine
American folk singers
Living people
Maritime music
People from Lewiston, Maine
Guitarists from Maine
American male bass guitarists
21st-century American singers
21st-century American bass guitarists
21st-century American male singers
Edward Little High School alumni